Boswell Historic District is a national historic district located at Boswell in Somerset County, Pennsylvania. The district includes 90 contributing buildings and 1 contributing site. It encompasses an area developed by the Merchant's Mining Company of Baltimore, Maryland starting in 1901.  It includes the remaining extant mine resources and the archaeological remains of the mine.  They consist of utilitarian industrial buildings, four types of vernacular housing, and a variety of commercial, social, and institutional buildings.  Notable buildings include the First National Bank of Boswell (1919), Merchant's Coal Company office (1901), St. Stanislaus Roman Catholic Church (1918), and Sts. Peter and Paul Russian Orthodox Church (1918).

It was listed on the National Register of Historic Places in 1994.

References

External links

Historic American Buildings Survey in Pennsylvania
Historic American Engineering Record in Pennsylvania
Colonial Revival architecture in Pennsylvania
Historic districts in Somerset County, Pennsylvania
Historic districts on the National Register of Historic Places in Pennsylvania
National Register of Historic Places in Somerset County, Pennsylvania